Muhittin Erdem Baştürk (born 3 January 1991) is a German footballer who plays as a centre back for SSV Jeddeloh. He made his 3. Liga debut on 20 July 2013.

References

External links
 
 
 
 
 

1991 births
Living people
German people of Turkish descent
Sportspeople from Neunkirchen, Saarland
Turkish footballers
German footballers
Footballers from Saarland
Association football midfielders
Germany youth international footballers
Borussia Neunkirchen players
Borussia Mönchengladbach II players
SV Elversberg players
VfB Oldenburg players
Berliner AK 07 players
SSV Jeddeloh players
3. Liga players